This is a list of conflicts in Chad arranged chronologically from medieval to modern times. This list includes both nationwide and international types of war, including the following: wars of independence, liberation wars, colonial wars, undeclared wars, proxy wars, territorial disputes, and world wars. Also listed might be any battle that occurred within the territory of what is today known as the, "Republic of Chad" but was itself only part of an operation of a campaign of a theater of a war. There may also be periods of violent civil unrest listed, such as: riots, shootouts, spree killings, massacres, terrorist attacks, and civil wars. The list might also contain episodes of: human sacrifice, mass suicide, massacres, and genocides.

Medieval times

Kanem Empire

c. 1203 — c. 1243 Dunama Dabbalemi, of the Sayfawa dynasty, mai of the Kanem Empire, declared jihad against the surrounding tribes and initiated an extended period of conquest.
c. 1342 — c. 1388 Fall of Kanem
c. 1342 — c. 1352 Sao Resurgence
c. 1376 — c. 1388 Bulala Invasion

Modern times

Ouaddai Empire

1870 — 22 April 1900 Rabih az-Zubayr ibn Fadl Allah's War
1909 — 1911 Ouaddai War (Ouadddai Empire)

French Chad

1870 — 22 April 1900 Rabih az-Zubayr ibn Fadl Allah's War in French Chad
1909 — 1911 Ouaddai War
1915, 15 November 1917 Massacre des coupes-coupes (in Arabic: Kabkab Massacre, مجزرة كبكب) meaning cut-cut and referring to the beheading of 400 Muslim Scholars from various parts of Chad in one of the rarely recorded French massacres in Africa.

Republic of Chad

November 1, 1965 Mangalmé riots
1965 — 2010 War in Chad
1965 — 2010 Chadian Civil War
1965 — 1979 Civil war in Chad
1979 — 1982 Civil war in Chad
1998 — 2002 Civil war in Chad
18 December 2005 — 15 January 2010 Civil war in Chad
18 December 2005 Battle of Adré
6 January 2006 Borota raid
6 March 2006 Amdjereme raid
13 April 2006 Battle of N'Djamena
1 May 2006 Dalola raid
2 February 2008 — 4 February 2008 Battle of N'Djamena
18 June 2008 Battle of Am Zoer
7 May 2009 Battle of Am Dam
24 April 2010 — 28 April 2010 Battle of Tamassi
1978 — 1987 Chadian—Libyan conflict
1983 — 1984 Operation Manta
13 February 1986 — 2014 Opération Épervier
1986 Tibesti War
16 December 1986 — 11 September 11, 1987 Toyota War
11 April 2002 — ongoing Insurgency in the Maghreb

References

See also
Chadian Ground Forces
Chadian Air Force
Military history of Africa
African military systems up until the year 1800 CE
African military systems between the years 1800 CE and 1900 CE
African military systems after the year 1900 CE

Military history of Chad
Conflicts
Conflicts